Steve Schmidt (born July 17, 1984) is former Canadian football fullback and long snapper. He last played for the Hamilton Tiger-Cats of the Canadian Football League. He was drafted in the fourth round of the 2008 CFL Draft by the Toronto Argonauts. He played college football at San Diego State.

On May 5, 2010, the Argonauts traded Schmidt to the Tiger-Cats in exchange for a conditional draft pick in the 2012 CFL Draft.

External links
Toronto Argonauts bio

Canadian football people from Winnipeg
Canadian football fullbacks
Toronto Argonauts players
Players of Canadian football from Manitoba
Butte Roadrunners football players
San Diego State Aztecs football players
1984 births
Living people